GFS may refer to:

Computing 
 GFS2 (Global File System 2), in Linux
 Global Forecast System, US weather prediction system
 Google File System

Education 
 Garrison Forest School, in Owing Mills, Maryland, US
 Germantown Friends School, in Philadelphia, Pennsylvania, US
 Griffith Film School, in Brisbane, Australia

Other uses 
 Genome-based peptide fingerprint scanning
 GFS Projects (Geoff's Flying Saucer), a British aerospace company
 Girls' Friendly Society
 GlobalFoundries (Nasdaq: GFS), an American semiconductor manufacturing company
 Glucose-fructose syrup, another name for high-fructose corn syrup
 Government Flying Service, Hong Kong
 Gordon Food Service, North America
 Greek Font Society
 Grounds For Sculpture, sculpture park and museum located in Hamilton, New Jersey, United States
 Groupe Feministe Socialiste, a defunct French feminist group
George Floyd Square, a memorial in Minneapolis, Minnesota, United States

See also 
 GF (disambiguation)